Alan Resnick (born July 16, 1986) is an American comedian, visual artist, and filmmaker. He is a member of the Wham City arts collective and founding member of Wham City Comedy.

Work 

Before working on Adult Swim, Resnick first gained recognition for creating the popular YouTube web series, alantutorial, in 2011. The surrealist series initially began as a tutorial channel from a man attempting to instruct the viewer on nonsensical tasks. Over the course of three years, the series gained strong horror elements as the videos depicted Alan locked out of his house, left homeless, and kidnapped. In the final "tutorial" video, uploaded December 12, 2014, Alan breaks through a wall and escapes the building where he was being held. Gizmodo called Resnick's video "ARM tutorial" one of the "weirdest videos on the internet".

In 2012, Resnick self-published the book $8.95, a series of online customer service chats between Resnick and Bank of America in which Resnick pleads to recover his eponymous bank fee.
Also that year, Resnick directed the music video for Dan Deacon's "Guilford Avenue Bridge" and Lower Dens' "Candy".

In 2013, Resnick and fellow Wham City member Ben O'Brien created & directed the TV special Live Forever as You Are Now with Alan Resnick, pitched to Adult Swim. The short starred Resnick as himself, in a surreal parody of self-help infomercials, selling digital immortality. This was the duo's first collaboration with Adult Swim and premiered on the network's Infomercials block - premiering at 4:00 A.M., without a title card or common identifier. Despite this, it received positive acclaim and recognition for Wham City, being called "hilarious" and "a good representation of their bizarre comedic stylings."
 Principal photography for the infomercial was conducted in the Copycat Building during the summer of 2013.

In 2014, Resnick and O'Brien continued to work with Adult Swim's Infomercials, creating the horror short Unedited Footage of a Bear, a parody of allergy medication advertisements, and a veiled cautionary tale about antidepressant abuse, which slowly descends into chaos. The short gained the duo more popularity, and was called "the scariest TV show of 2014". Since launching that year, Resnick has been a contributing writer for The Onion'''s sister publication, ClickHole. Resnick also premiered a set of new media art pieces in collaboration with artist Lesser Gonzalez, at the Springsteen Gallery in Baltimore, MD.Woods, Baynard. "This Modern World: Two artists turn cultural detritus into high art", Baltimore, 4 August 2014, Retrieved on 1 October 2014.

In 2016, Adult Swim aired Resnick's third short film, This House Has People In It. The short film aired at 4:00 A.M. between March 14–19. The short itself consists of surveillance camera footage of a mundane suburban family that descends into surreal horror as the eldest daughter begins phasing through the kitchen floor, based on the found footage genre. The resulting alternate reality game explores many of the events leading up to and following This House with a total of over two hours' worth of video and audio files alongside numerous logs, images, and text documents.

Later in 2016, Resnick starred in IFC's webseries "The Mirror" as Wesley. In 2017, Resnick made an animated film for Super Deluxe called "Johnny Bubble", featuring the titular character in a series of odd events until he dies.

In 2018, his short film, May I Please Enter, was released. In 2020, his short What Codec Should I Use? was released.  In 2022, his latest short film Cool Blue Car was released as part of Adult Swim's smalls.

In 2022, he created a music video for I Didn't Know I Was Dead. by Negativland 

All his work on Adult Swim has been made in collaboration with Baltimore-based production company AB Video Solutions, LLC, (referenced within This House Has People In It as AB Surveillance Solutions) an offshoot of the Wham City arts collective. AB Video Solutions LLC'' is made up of Resnick, Ben O'Brien, Robby Rackleff, Cricket Arrison, and Dina Kelberman.

Personal life
Resnick lived in Baltimore for 10 years and is currently residing in Los Angeles. He is married to fellow artist Dina Kelberman.

Filmography

Television

Web

References

External links 
 

State University of New York at Purchase alumni
Comedians from Maryland
Living people
American music video directors
People from Baltimore
1986 births
21st-century American comedians